Johnathan Kovacevic (born July 12, 1997) is a Canadian professional ice hockey defenceman who currently plays for the Montreal Canadiens of the National Hockey League (NHL).

Personal life 
Kovacevic is the son of a Montenegrin father, Novica, and a Bosnian mother, Angie. He has a brother, Ryan, and a sister, Daniela. He holds a civil engineering degree from Merrimack.

Playing career
At the 2017 NHL Entry Draft, Kovacevic was drafted in the third round, 74th overall by the Winnipeg Jets.

After three seasons with Merrimack College, Kovacevic signed a two-year entry level contract with the Jets on March 17, 2019. He made his professional debut with the Jets' American Hockey League affiliate, the Manitoba Moose, on April 19, 2019, scoring one goal and one assist against the Chicago Wolves.

On August 13, 2021, Kovacevic was re-signed by the Jets to a one-year, two-way contract worth $750,000 at the NHL level. In the following  season, Kovacevic was recalled from the Moose and played in his first NHL game with the Jets on January 28, 2022 against the Vancouver Canucks, finishing the game with one shot on goal in 10:21 of ice time.

As a restricted free agent, Kovacevic was re-signed to a three-year contract extension with the Jets on July 22, 2022. After attending the Jets 2022 training camp in preparation for the  season, Kovacevic was placed on waivers during the pre-season. He was claimed off waivers the following day by the Montreal Canadiens on October 8, 2022. Acquired by the Canadiens to help with weakness on the right side of the defence corps, Kovacevic made his debut in the season opener on October 12 and immediately became a regular part of the lineup. He surpassed his prior NHL appearance total within eight days of his first game. Kovacevic was regularly paired with rookie defenceman Jordan Harris, and drew praise from the coaching staff. On November 14, Canadiens executive Jeff Gorton advised Kovacevic to find regular accommodations in Montreal, indicating that he had found a permanent roster berth for the foreseeable future. He remarked on the occasion that "it gives me a little bit of an idea that they like what they see from me, they want me for a bit of a longer haul. Because when you’re picked up on waivers, you never really know."

On December 6, 2022, Kovacevic scored his first career NHL goal in a game against the Seattle Kraken.

Career statistics

Awards and honours

References

External links
 

1997 births
Living people
Canadian ice hockey defencemen
Canadian people of Montenegrin descent
Ice hockey people from Ontario
Manitoba Moose players
Merrimack Warriors men's ice hockey players
Montreal Canadiens players
People from Grimsby, Ontario
Winnipeg Jets draft picks
Winnipeg Jets players